Rich Dimler was a former nose tackle in the National Football League.

Biography
Dimler was born Richard Alan Dimler on July 18, 1956 to Alan and Marie Dimler in Bayonne, New Jersey. Richard was the middle child in a family of three which included sisters Mary Dimler and Debra Dimler. He graduated from Bayonne High School in 1975, playing football all four years. He was recruited by USC, again playing all four years, lettering all four years. He was then drafted the NFL to play for the Browns. He was very close to his niece and nephews Keith Dimler, Kristen Dimler, Josh Haggin and Dillon Haggin. He died due to pancreatitis on September 30, 2000 in Torrance, California.

Career
Dimler was drafted in the fifth round of the 1979 NFL Draft by the Cleveland Browns and played that season with the team. The following season, he played with the Green Bay Packers. He also played for the Philadelphia Stars and the Los Angeles Express (USFL) of the United States Football League.

He played at the collegiate level at the University of Southern California, where he was a co-captain of the 1978 National Champion Trojans team.

See also
List of Green Bay Packers players

References

Sportspeople from Bayonne, New Jersey
Cleveland Browns players
Green Bay Packers players
American football defensive tackles
University of Southern California alumni
USC Trojans football players
1956 births
2000 deaths
Deaths from pancreatitis
Players of American football from New Jersey